Wood Green was a constituency for the House of Commons of the UK Parliament 1918—1983, centred on the Wood Green area of North London and its earlier broadest form included much of the seat of Enfield Southgate, created in 1950.  It returned one Member of Parliament (MP).

History

The Wood Green constituency was created for the 1918 general election and abolished for the 1983 general election.

It returned Conservative MPs until 1950, and then Labour or Labour Co-operative MPs until its abolition.

Boundaries

1918–1950: The Urban Districts of Wood Green and Southgate.

1950–1974: The Borough of Wood Green, and the Borough of Tottenham wards of Coleraine, Park, and White Hart Lane.

1974–1983: The Borough of Haringey wards of Alexandra-Bowes, Coleraine, Noel Park, Park, and Town Hall.

Members of Parliament

Elections

Elections in the 1910s

Elections in the 1920s

Elections in the 1930s 

General Election 1939–40:
Another General Election was required to take place before the end of 1940. The political parties had been making preparations for an election to take place and by the Autumn of 1939, the following candidates had been selected; 
Conservative: Beverley Baxter
Liberal: Hew Thomson Fraser
Labour: Dorothy Woodman

Elections in the 1940s

Elections in the 1950s

Elections in the 1960s

Elections in the 1970s

References

Parliamentary constituencies in London (historic)
Constituencies of the Parliament of the United Kingdom established in 1918
Constituencies of the Parliament of the United Kingdom disestablished in 1983
Politics of the London Borough of Haringey
Wood Green